Alexander Yefimovich Salomonovich (1916–1989) was a Soviet radio astronomer. He graduated from the Physical Faculty of Moscow State University in 1939.

During 1953–1959, he was chief scientist responsible for creation of the Lebedev RT-22 22 meter precision radio telescope and until 1964 he was the chief scientist for operations with this instrument.

References 

 Sullivan, W. III (Ed.). The Early Years of Radio Astronomy: Reflections Fifty Years after Jansky's Discovery. London: Cambridge University Press, 1984.

External links 
 

Soviet astronomers
1916 births
1989 deaths
Radio astronomers
Moscow State University alumni